Australia and Chile enjoy friendly relations, the importance of which centers on the history of Chilean immigration to Australia. In 2016, over 26,000 Chilean-born people lived in Australia. The two nations are members of the Asia-Pacific Economic Cooperation, Cairns Group and the OECD. Chile is geographically the closest country in the Americas to Australia, and both administer several islands in the South Pacific.

History
As early as the nineteenth century, Australia and Chile had informal relations as Australia was still part of the British Empire. The first known Chilean to arrive in Australia was former president and political exile, General Ramón Freire, who arrived in 1838. Australia's third Prime Minister, Chris Watson was born in Valparaíso, Chile in 1867 and emigrated to Australia.

In 1899, Chile opened a consular office in Newcastle, New South Wales. Official diplomatic relations were established on 27 December 1945 and Chile upgraded its consular office to a diplomatic legation. In 1946, Australia opened a diplomatic legation in Santiago. In 1968, Australia upgraded its diplomatic legation to an embassy in Chile. The move was reciprocated when Chile upgraded its diplomatic legation to an embassy in 1969.

In the early twentieth century, Chileans began immigrating to Australia with the 1901 census showing 90 Chilean nations in the country. Migration to Australia would increase in the 1970s after the 1973 Chilean coup d'état when several thousand Chileans left the country escaping political persecution. In December 1989, Chile returned to democracy. In 1993, President Patricio Aylwin became the first Chilean head of state to pay an official visit to Australia. In 2004, Prime Minister John Howard became the first Australian head of government to visit Chile and to attend the APEC Summit.

Both nations consider each other to be "like-minded" in multilateral forums. In 2015, Australia and Chile marked the 70th anniversary of diplomatic relations.

Chilean state-run infrastructure fund Desarrollo País and H2 Cable, a subsidiary of Singapore's BW Digital, announced in 2022 that they were seeking a partner to begin work on the Humboldt Cable, which would help connect Chile to Australia. The two companies issued a request for proposals (RFP) for a strategic partner to supply and install the submarine cable system. The planned system would span roughly 15,000 kilometers, and connects Valparaiso, Chile, to Sydney, Australia, with provision for branches to additional locations including the Juan Fernández Islands, Easter Island, New Zealand, and Antarctica. Cost estimates ranged between $450 million and $650 million.

High-level visits

High-level visits from Australia to Chile

 Prime Minister John Howard (2004)
 Governor-General Peter Cosgrove (2016)

Presidential visits from Chile to Australia

 President Patricio Aylwin (1993)
 President Ricardo Lagos (2005)
 President Michelle Bachelet (2007)
 President Sebastián Piñera (2012)

Bilateral Agreements
Both nations have signed several bilateral agreements, such as an Extradition Treaty (1996); Agreement on Reciprocal Promotion and Protection of Investments (1999); Agreement on Social Security (2004); Agreement on a work and holiday visa program (2005) and an Agreement on the avoidance of Double-Taxation (2013).

Transportation
There are direct flights between Australia and Chile with the following airlines: LATAM Chile (notably with Sydney-Santiago and Melbourne-Santiago routes) and Qantas (with the Sydney-Santiago route operational).

Trade
In 2016, two-way trade between Australia and Chile totaled $1.4 billion AUS. Australia's main exports to Chile include: Coal, measuring and analysing instruments, specialized machinery and parts, and civil engineering equipment and parts. Chile's main exports to Australia include: copper, fruits, wood, and ores and concentrates. In 2017, Australia launched Free Trade negotiations with Chile. Chile is Australia's third-largest trading partner in Latin America. Australia is the sixth largest foreign investor in Chile, with investments totaling over $6.34 billion AUS.

Resident diplomatic missions
 Australia has an embassy in Santiago.
 Chile has an embassy in Canberra and consulates-general in Melbourne and Sydney.

See also
 Australia–Chile bilateral treaties
 Australia–Chile Free Trade Agreement
 Chilean Australians

References

 
Chile
Australia